Prelude on the Babylonian Captivity of the Church (October 1520) was the second of the three major treatises published by Martin Luther in 1520, coming after the Address to the Christian Nobility of the German Nation (August 1520) and before On the Freedom of a Christian (November 1520). The book-length work was theological, and as such was published in Latin as well as German, the language in which the treatises were written.

Context 
The book was circulating in print not quite a week when the papal bull against Luther arrived in Wittenberg in October 1520. The bull and the book were being prepared simultaneously.

Luther accuses the Catholic Church and the papacy of keeping the church in captivity, equating Rome with the biblical Babylon that exiled the Israelites from their homeland, holding them captive in Babylon. According to Luther, the pope was holding the church in captivity through the use of the sacramental system and Catholic theology.

In 1521, Luther was requested to either confess or recant his books, including his treatise The Babylonian Captivity of the Church.It still defines the Confessional Lutheran relationship to the number of sacraments.

Content
In this work Luther examines the seven sacraments of the Catholic Church in the light of his interpretation of the Bible. With regard to the Eucharist, he advocates restoring the cup to the laity, dismisses the Catholic doctrine of transubstantiation but affirms the real presence of the body and blood of Christ in the Eucharist, and rejects the teaching that the Mass is a sacrifice offered to God.

With regard to baptism, he writes that it brings justification only if conjoined with saving faith in the recipient; however, it remains the foundation of salvation even for those who might later fall and be reclaimed.

As for penance, its essence consists in the words of promise (absolution) received by faith. Only these three can be regarded as sacraments because of their divine institution and the divine promises of salvation connected with them; but strictly speaking, only Baptism and the Eucharist are sacraments, since only they have "divinely instituted visible sign[s]": water in Baptism and bread and wine in the Eucharist. Luther claimed that Confirmation, Matrimony, Holy Orders, and Extreme Unction are not sacraments.

The titular "captivity" is firstly the withholding the cup in the Lord's Supper from the laity, the second the doctrine of transubstantiation, and the third, the Roman Catholic Church's teaching that the Mass was a sacrifice and a good work.

The work is angry in tone, attacking the papacy. Although Luther had made a link tentatively in the address To the Christian Nobility of the German Nation, this was the first time he forthrightly accused the pope of being the Antichrist. It certainly heralded a radicalisation of Luther's views — only a year before he had defended the validity of the sacraments, yet was now attacking them fiercely.

Although published in Latin, a translation of this work was quickly published in German by Luther’s opponent, the Strasbourg Franciscan Thomas Murner. He hoped that by making people aware of the radical nature of Luther’s beliefs, they would realise their foolishness in supporting him. In fact, the opposite proved true, and Murner’s translation helped to spread Luther’s views across Germany. The virulence of Luther's language however, was off-putting to some. After the publication of this work, with its harsh condemnation of the papacy, the renowned humanist Erasmus, who had previously been cautiously supportive of Luther's activities, became convinced that he should not support Luther's calls for reform.

References

Pelikan, Jaroslav and Lehmann, Helmut T, Luther’s Works, 55 vols, (Saint Louis, Philadelphia, 1955–76), Vol 36

External links
Full text at Christian Classics Ethereal Library
 

1520 books
16th-century Christian texts
Works by Martin Luther